Gátova (Valencian: Gàtova) is a municipality in the comarca of Camp de Túria in the Valencian Community, Spain.

The town is situated in the heart of the Serra Calderona, a natural protected park in Valencia.

References

External links
La Sierra Calderona 
Parcs Naturals de la Comunitat Valenciana - Official List

Municipalities in Camp de Túria
Populated places in Camp de Túria